Moppy River, a perennial river of the Manning River catchment, is located in the Upper Hunter district of New South Wales, Australia.

Course and features
Moppy River rises in the Barrington Tops, on the eastern slopes of Mount Royal Range, south of Tunderbolts Lookout in the Barrington Tops National Park, and flows generally east before reaching its confluence with the Barrington River, near the village of Moppy. The river descends  over its  course.

See also 

 Rivers of New South Wales
 List of rivers of New South Wales (L–Z)
 List of rivers of Australia

References

Rivers of New South Wales
Rivers of the Hunter Region
Mid-Coast Council